Eunice is a 1982 American made-for-television comedy-drama film starring Carol Burnett, Harvey Korman, Vicki Lawrence, Ken Berry and Betty White which is based on characters of a recurring series of comedy sketches called "The Family" featured on The Carol Burnett Show (1974–78) and Carol Burnett & Company (1979). The film was broadcast as a "CBS Special Presentation" on March 15, 1982 and served as a precursor to the spin-off television sitcom Mama's Family. It was directed by Roger Beatty and Harvey Korman.

Plot
Eunice is divided into four acts, spanning 23 years in the life of Eunice Harper Higgins:

1955: A young Eunice Harper is looking forward to going to a party with her date Ed Higgins. Eunice's brother Phillip, a recent college graduate, comes home and announces that he has a chance to go to New York City in hopes of becoming a writer and must leave that day. In the meantime, their mother Thelma Harper is frantic about Phillip going so spontaneously and is trying to get her husband Carl out of the bathroom to stop their son from leaving. Ed and Eunice have a fight on the porch because Ed doesn't want to go to the party. Ed storms off, they break up, and Eunice goes to the party.

1963: Ed and Eunice are married and have two sons, Billy and Bubba. Ed and Eunice come to Thelma's house to see Phillip, who is visiting from New York. Phillip is now a bestselling author of a historical novel. He announces that a movie producer wants to make one of his books into a film. Carl died years earlier and Thelma wants to visit his grave. Eunice, who wants to be an actress, wants to leave with Phillip and be in the film.

1973: Ed and Eunice are divorced and Phillip, who has won the Pulitzer Prize, is visiting again, this time from Los Angeles. Although many of his books were made into movies, he decides this time to write the screenplay for a new film. Eunice still wants a part in Phillip's film. At the same time, Bubba, who has been missing for almost a year, calls, and a frantic Eunice demands to know where he is.

1978: Eunice, Phillip, and their sister Ellen come home from Thelma's funeral. The three siblings are discussing Thelma's death, the funeral, and the future. Ed shows up to give his condolences, and seems to want to reconcile with Eunice, and after she agrees to give it a try, he mentions he had remarried; and it turns out he was really hoping to get Phillip to invest in his new hardware business. After Eunice throws Ed out, she gets into an argument with Ellen, who storms out. Eunice, in a frenzy, finally breaks down yelling out for Thelma. In Thelma's bedroom, Phillip tells Eunice that the only thing stopping her from the life she wants to live is herself. Phillip convinces Eunice to spontaneously come to Los Angeles with him. She decides to leave with Phillip and in her excitement, she calls her Aunt Ina to let her know what her plans are. Aunt Ina wants Eunice to help her with her sore back and it's implied that Eunice will never actually get to live the life she wants.

Cast
 Carol Burnett as Eunice
 Harvey Korman as Ed
 Vicki Lawrence as Mama
 Ken Berry as Phillip
 Betty White as Ellen
 Dick Clair as Carl (voice only)

Reception
Lawrence was nominated for a Primetime Emmy Award for Outstanding Supporting Actress in a Miniseries or a Movie for her role as Thelma Harper.

Home media
Eunice was released as a bonus feature on Mama's Family: The Complete Second Season DVD set on September 10, 2013.

References

External links

1982 television films
1982 films
1982 comedy-drama films
American comedy-drama films
CBS network films
Fictional families
Films about dysfunctional families
Films set in 1955
Films set in 1963
Films set in 1973
Films set in 1978
Film spin-offs
Television series reunion films
Warner Bros. films
Carol Burnett
American drama television films
1980s English-language films
Films directed by Roger Beatty
1980s American films